The Atayal Life Museum is a museum about Atayal people in Datong Township, Yilan County, Taiwan.

History
The museum was opened in 2008.

Exhibitions
The museum exhibits various cultural relics of Atayal people.

Activities
The museum preserves, collects and conducts research on Atayal culture. It also regularly holds various arts and cultural performances.

See also
 List of museums in Taiwan
 Taiwanese aborigines

References

External links

  

2008 establishments in Taiwan
Museums established in 2008
Atayal culture
Museums in Yilan County, Taiwan